Antônio Mattar Neto (born 14 November 1944) is a Brazilian former footballer who competed in the 1964 Summer Olympics.

References

1944 births
Living people
Association football forwards
Brazilian footballers
Olympic footballers of Brazil
Footballers at the 1964 Summer Olympics
Comercial Futebol Clube (Ribeirão Preto) players